TB Alert is a charity working to raise awareness about and support effective treatment of the disease tuberculosis in the UK and internationally.  It was registered in 1998 and launched on World Tuberculosis Day in 1999 in response to the resurgence of tuberculosis (TB) in the UK and worldwide. It is headquartered in Brighton.

Vision, mission and approach

The stated vision of TB Alert is the control and ultimate eradication of TB.
Their mission is to increase access to effective treatment for all.

The organisation works towards this by:
 raising awareness of TB
 emphasising the importance of working with people most affected by or vulnerable to TB
 supporting patients to help them complete their treatment
 addressing TB/HIV co-infection
 focusing on building capacity, leadership, responsibility and knowledge of TB within existing community structures
 working with a diverse range of partners including civil society, health care providers, TB clinics and national/regional TB programmes
 providing technical and financial support so that local NGOs and CBOs can integrate TB into their existing programmes
 advocating for greater effort in the fight against TB

Active projects

UK projects

TB Action Group

The TB Action Group (TBAG) is a group of people with an interest in promoting awareness of TB in the UK, providing peer support to patients and lobbying for improvements to the existing treatment and support provided by the NHS. Although TB Alert provided funding and administrative support to the group, decisions on its specific activities are taken by its members, who are typically current or former TB patients, or have been affected by the illness of someone close to them.

Raising awareness
A key element of TB Alert's work in the UK is making medical professionals and the general public aware of the continued existence of tuberculosis in the UK. Examples of their activities in this area include:
 providing leaflets and posters for use in doctors' waiting rooms
 responding to requests for information from the media, patients and medical professionals
 mounting exhibitions
 providing speakers at medical and nursing conferences
 producing detailed leaflets about treatment and clinical issues for use by patients and healthcare professionals

Patient support
In recognition of the fact that many TB patients come from the poorer sections of society and may find this a barrier to completing treatment, a patient support fund is available to provide small grants. The money can go towards costs such as bus fares to attend appointments or nutritious food to support recovery.

India

TB Alert India

TB Alert India is registered separately in India and partnered with TB Alert in the UK. It was founded in 2004. Projects include the establishment of microscopy centres to aid diagnosis, education programmes about TB and the increased risk in conjunction with HIV infection, training DOTS providers and supporting other NGOs with established links to local communities to help raise awareness in those communities. Work is focussed on Andhra Pradesh, which projects also running in Delhi, Bihar, Uttar Pradesh and Madhya Pradesh.

Nav Jivan Mission Hospital
Nav Jivan Mission Hospital (NJMH) is situated in Palamu District, Jharkhand. With support from TB Alert the hospital has established facilities for the free diagnosis and treatment of TB, serving mainly local subsistence farmers and their families.

Zambia

Bwafwano

TB Alert has provided support enabling Bwafwano, a Zambian charity based in Lusaka to train volunteers to provide treatment, support and counselling to patients in their local community. Workshops are also run for community leaders, informing them about TB and HIV and the work that Bwafwano does.

Chichetekelo Outreach Partners
TB Alert provides funding for this project in the poor Kabwe province, where rates of TB and HIV are high and infection carries a powerful social stigma. Chichetekelo uses adults who have been cured of TB as outreach partners, visiting villages and speaking in centres such as schools or churches about their experience. They address myths and misconceptions surrounding TB and spread the message that TB is a treatable disease.

Zimbabwe
In Zimbabwe, TB Alert supports the TB services at Murambinda hospital in Buhera District. The hospital is owned by the Sisters of the Little Company of Mary. Recent economic turmoil in Zimbabwe has placed enormous pressure on healthcare services, as well as leaving the population more vulnerable to tuberculosis infection through lack of proper nutrition.

President and Patrons

Honorary President
Sir John Crofton 1912–2009.

Emeritus Professor of Respiratory Diseases and Tuberculosis, University of Edinburgh Sir John Crofton was knighted in 1977 for his contributions to TB control. As Professor of tuberculosis and respiratory disease in Edinburgh (where TB was the leading cause of death in young people) in the 1950s, Sir John led the team responsible for bringing TB under control in only 6 years – 1/3 of the time predicted. This was the first demonstration of mass control of TB, and his no-nonsense "Edinburgh method" was subsequently instituted in 23 European countries. An indefatigable pioneer and international physician, Sir John has been a leader in the work of the World Health Organization (WHO) and other international bodies, a celebrated author and an influential teacher. The International Union Against Tuberculosis and Lung Disease (IUATLD) awarded Sir John the organisation's highest award, The Union Medal, which recognises outstanding contributions to the control of tuberculosis and lung disease, on October 19, 2005. Never one to slow down, to the end of his life at the ripe age of 97 Sir John continued as an inspiring worker in the field of tuberculosis and tobacco control, and fundraising tirelessly on behalf of TB Alert. He will be sadly missed.

Patrons
Lord (Robert) Kilpatrick of Kincraig, Doctor and past President of the General Medical Council. He was one of the first patients to be treated with streptomycin.

Archbishop Emeritus Desmond Tutu, South African activist and Nobel Peace Prize winner.

References

External links
  Official website
  TB Action Group webspace
  Charities Commission Registered charity number 1071886

Charities based in England